Atli Danielsen (born 15 August 1983) is a Faroese footballer who currently plays for KÍ Klaksvík in the Premier League of the Faroe Islands.

Club career
Danielsen started with KÍ Klaksvík, playing his first game in their 2000 league season. After he became a regular in the national team he was loaned to Norwegian side Sogndal before he signed for Danish outfit Boldklubben Frem. In the wintertransfer 2010, he signed FC Roskilde.

International career
Danielsen is a regular in the Faroese national team. He made his debut in April 2003 in friendly match against Kazakhstan, coming on as a substitute for Hans Fróði Hansen.

External links
Profile at faroesoccer.com 
Profile at national-football-teams.com
Boldklubben Frem profile 

1983 births
Living people
Association football defenders
Faroese footballers
Faroe Islands international footballers
Sogndal Fotball players
Boldklubben Frem players
Association football utility players
Expatriate footballers in Norway
KÍ Klaksvík players
FC Roskilde players
Faroe Islands youth international footballers